Hanwha TotalEnergies Petrochemical Co., Ltd., (Hangul: 한화토탈에너지스) is a joint venture between Hanwha and TotalEnergies Both companies own a 50% partnership in the venture.

Founded in 2003 as a joint venture between Samsung General Chemicals and Total (as Samsung Atofina; changed name to Samsung Total in 2004), it was sold to Hanwha in 2015.

The company manufactures building block chemicals that go into the making of a host of other chemicals needed to make various consumer products. It starts with a naphtha cracker, yielding propylene and ethylene, which are the raw materials in the production of all manner of polymers. Hanwha TotalEnergies Petrochemical divides its operations in three: polymer production (polyethylene, polypropylene, high- and low-density polyethylene), base chemicals (selling the ethylene and propylene the company doesn't use itself, as well as aromatics used to make the materials that go into synthetic fibers), and oil products (jet, diesel, gasoline,...)

Hanwha TotalEnergies Petrochemical's headquarter is located at Daesan, the South Chungcheong Province in South Korea.
It operates a large petrochemical complex, consisting of 13 separate plants in Daesan. And in addition, PP, PE compounding plant was at Dongkwan in China. Sales offices are operated in Seoul, Busan, Daegu, Gwangju and Daejeon. In Asia, Hanwha TotalEnergies Petrochemical's sales offices are located in Beijing, Shanghai, Shenzhen, Hong Kong, Tokyo, and Nagoya. Hanwha TotalEnergies Petrochemical employs 1788 people as of 2021 December.

References

External links 
https://www.htpchem.com/

Total
Joint ventures
Multinational companies
Petrochemical companies
Hanwha